Mark McDonald may refer to:

 Mark McDonald (politician) (born 1980), Scottish politician
 Mark McDonald (hurler) (1888–1952), Irish hurler
 Marc McDonald, American who was Microsoft's first salaried employee

See also
 Mark MacDonald (disambiguation)
 McDonald family, owners of "Mableton" historic house in Santa Rosa